Austrochthonius insularis is a species of pseudoscorpions in the family Chthoniidae.

Distribution 
The species is endemic to the Crozet Islands in the French Southern and Antarctic Lands.

Original publication 
 Vitali-di Castri, 1968 : Austrochthonius insularis, nouvelle espèce de pseudoscorpions de l'archipel des Crozet (Heterosphyronida, Chthoniidae). Bulletin du Muséum National d'Histoire Naturelle, Paris, ser. 2, vol. 40, .

External links 
 Catalogue of Life : Austrochthonius insularis  Vitali-di Castri, 1968  
 

Crozet Islands
Chthonioidea
Chthoniidae